Zagreb is the largest city in Croatia and the only one whose metropolitan area exceeds one million people. The official population of the city of Zagreb is 790,017 according to the 2011 census. According to the same census, there are 1,088,841 people in the Zagreb metropolitan area including the towns of Samobor, Velika Gorica and Zaprešić.

Overview
According to the local police register department, which bases its information on the number of the applicants who wish to register to vote in Zagreb, in 2005 the city had a population of 973,667.

Most people live in the city proper. The official 2011 census counted 790,017 residents,

Zagreb metropolitan area population is slightly above 1.2 million inhabitants, as it includes the Zagreb County.
In 1997, the City of Zagreb itself was given special County status, separating it from Zagreb County, although it remains the administrative center of both.

The majority of its citizens are Croats making up 92% of the city's population (2001 census). The same census records 60,066 residents belonging to ethnic minorities. Such ethnic minorities comprise: 18,811 Serbs (2.41%), 8,030 ethnic Muslims (1.02%), 6,389 Albanians (0.83%), 6,204 Bosniaks (0.80%), 3,946 Romani (0.55%), 3,225 Slovenes (0.41%), 2,315 Macedonians (0.27%), 2,131 Montenegrins (0.27%), together with other smaller minor ethnic communities, especially the historically present Germans.

Below is the demographic data of Zagreb from the 2011 census.

Ethnicities
Source: Croatian Central Bureau of Statistics, Census 2001

1 This mode includes, among others:

Religions
Source: Croatian Central Bureau of Statistics, Census 2001

References

Geography of Zagreb
History of Zagreb
Zagreb
Zagreb